Bartholomew Horsten (born 14 March 2002 in Sydney) is an Australian-Irish racing driver. He last competed in the 2021 BRDC British Formula 3 Championship, driving for Hitech GP.

Career

Australian Formula Ford Series
In 2018 Horsten made his single-seater debut, competing in the Australian Formula Ford Series, taking three podiums and one fastest lap to finish ninth in the championship.

F4 British Championship
In 2019, Horsten competed in British F4 with Arden where he achieved ten podium finishes, including his maiden victory in the second round at Donington Park. This, along with a fastest lap at Knockhill meant the Australian finished fifth in the championship, three and four positions ahead of teammates Tommy Foster and Alex Connor respectively.

BRDC British F3 Championship 
Horsten made a move to the BRDC British Formula 3 Championship for 2020, where he would compete with Lanan Racing, partnering Piers Prior and Josh Mason. In the second race of the season, he achieved his first podium of the year along with a fastest lap at the Oulton Park Circuit. Horsten picked up his best finish of second at Silverstone to take tenth place in the championship, beating both of his teammates.

For 2021, Horsten announced that he would be returning to British F3, partnering Reece Ushijima and Sebastian Alvarez at Hitech GP. The Australian started his season off with two points finishes and a retirement, which came when fighting for the race lead with Brit Ayrton Simmons, at the Brands Hatch Circuit. Horsten would score his first podium of the season in race 1 of the following round at Silverstone, setting the fastest lap in addition. At the fourth round of the season Horsten achieved two pole positions, but was unable to capitalise on his starting position, finishing races one and two in 5th and 4th. Horsten would have to wait until the reversed-grid race at the sixth round of the campaign to score his second podium, finishing third after having started from ninth place on the grid. After initial second-placed Branden Lee Oxley was disqualified for causing a collision, Horsten was promoted to second. At the penultimate round at Oulton Park he would finish second in race two, closing the gap to his rivals in the fight for second place in the standings before the season finale at Donington Park. Horsten would be unable to capitalize, ending up sixth in the standings.

Racing record

Career summary

* Season still in progress

Complete F4 British Championship results
(key) (Races in bold indicate pole position) (Races in italics indicate fastest lap)

Complete BRDC British F3 Championship results
(key) (Races in bold indicate pole position) (Races in italics indicate fastest lap)

* Season still in progress.

References

External links
Bart Horsten official website

2002 births
Living people
Australian racing drivers
BRDC British Formula 3 Championship drivers
Arden International drivers
British F4 Championship drivers
Hitech Grand Prix drivers